George Rowe may refer to:

George Rowe (cricketer) (1874–1950), South African cricketer
George Rowe (footballer) (born 1968), Scottish footballer and manager, mainly with Queen of the South
George Rowe (printmaker) (1796–1864), Cheltenham printmaker, lithographer and businessman
George Rowe (sport shooter) (1874–1952), Canadian sports shooter
George Rowe (actor) (1894–1975), American character actor
George Duncan Rowe (1857–1934), British stockbroker, co-founder of Rowe & Pitman
George Fawcett Rowe (1832–1889), actor and dramatist in Australia, UK, US

See also 
George Roe, owner of the now defunct Thomas Street Distillery, Dublin